Poli is a surname of Italian origin. The name refers to:

Afro Poli (1902–1988), Italian operatic baritone
Andrea Poli (born 1989), Italian professional football player
Antonio De Poli (born 1960), Italian politician
Barbara Fusar-Poli (born 1972), Italian ice dancer
Dante Poli (born 1976), Chilean professional football player
Eros Poli (born 1963), Italian professional road bicycle racer
Fabrizio Poli (born 1989), Italian professional football player
Fausto Poli (1581–1653), Italian Roman Catholic archbishop; private secretary to Pope Urban VIII
Giuseppe Saverio Poli (1746–1825), an Italian physicist, biologist and natural historian
Jacopo Poli (contemporary), Italian manager of the Poli Distillerie grappa distillery
Mario Aurelio Poli (born 1947), Argentine cardinal of the Roman Catholic Church
Ninsun Poli (contemporary), Assyrian singer and songwriter in Sweden
Paolo Poli (1929–2016) was an Italian theatre actor
Piero Poli (born 1960), Italian Olympic rower
Riccardo Poli (born 1961), Italian computer scientist and professor
Robert Edmund Poli (1936–2014), American labor union leader

Italian-language surnames
Surnames of Italian origin